In the dynamical systems theory, Thomas' cyclically symmetric attractor is a 3D strange attractor originally proposed by René Thomas. It has a simple form which is cyclically symmetric in the x,y, and z variables and can be viewed as the trajectory of a frictionally dampened particle moving in a 3D lattice of forces. The simple form has made it a popular example.

It is described by the differential equations

where  is a constant.

 corresponds to how dissipative the system is, and acts as a bifurcation parameter. For  the origin is the single stable equilibrium. At  it undergoes a pitchfork bifurcation, splitting into two attractive fixed points. Beyond this the attractor expands, undergoing a series of crises (up to six separate attractors can coexist for certain values). The fractal dimension of the attractor increases towards 3.

In the limit  the system lacks dissipation and the trajectory ergodically wanders the entire space (with an exception for 1.67%, where it drifts parallel to one of the coordinate axes: this corresponds to quasiperiodic torii). The dynamics has been described as deterministic fractional Brownian motion, and exhibits anomalous diffusion.

References

Nonlinear systems
Dynamical systems
Chaotic maps